EA-3167 is a potent and long-lasting anticholinergic deliriant drug, related to the chemical warfare agent 3-quinuclidinyl benzilate (QNB). It was developed under contract to Edgewood Arsenal during the 1960s as part of the US military chemical weapons program, in an attempt to develop non-lethal incapacitating agents. EA-3167 has identical effects to QNB, but is even more potent and longer-lasting, with an effective dose when administered by injection of as little as 2.5 μg/kg (i.e. 0.2 milligrams for an 80 kg person), and a duration of 120–240 hours (5–10 days). However unlike QNB, EA-3167 was never weaponized or manufactured in bulk.

Stereoisomers of EA-3167 have also been synthesized under the codename HL-031120.

See also 
 Edgewood Arsenal human experiments
 N-Methyl-3-piperidyl benzilate
 N-Ethyl-3-piperidyl benzilate
 3-Quinuclidinyl benzilate
 Ditran

References 

Deliriants
Muscarinic antagonists
Incapacitating agents
3-Quinuclidinyl esters
Acetate esters
Tertiary alcohols
Phenylcyclopentylglycolate esters